This is the list of Mexican football transfers of the Mexican Primera Division during the winter 2016–17 transfer window, grouped by club. It only includes football transfers related to clubs from the Liga Bancomer MX, the first division of Mexican football.

Liga Bancomer MX

América

In:

Out:

Atlas

In:

Out:

Chiapas

In:

Out:

Cruz Azul

In:

Out:

Guadalajara

In:

Out:

León

In:

Out:

Monterrey

In:

Out:

Morelia

In:

Out:

Necaxa

In:

Out:

Pachuca

In:

Out:

Puebla

In:

Out:

Querétaro

In:

Out:

Santos Laguna

In:

Out:

Tijuana

In:

Out:

Toluca

In:

Out:

UANL

In:

Out:

UNAM

In:

Out:

Veracruz

In:

 

Out:

See also 
 2016–17 Liga MX season

References 
 

Winter 2016–17
Mexico
Tran
Tran